Omegasome is a cell organelle consisting of lipid bilayer membranes enriched for phosphatidylinositol 3-phosphate (abbreviated PI(3)P or PtdIns3P), and related to a process of autophagy. It is a subdomain of the Endoplasmic Reticulum (ER), and has a morphology resembling the Greek capital letter Omega (Ω). Omegasomes are the sites from which phagophores (also called "isolation membranes") form, which are sack-like structures that mature into autophagosomes, and fuse with lysosomes in order to degrade the contents of the autophagosomes. The formation of omegasomes depends on various factors, however in general, formation of omegasomes is increased as a response to starvation, and in some biochemical situations the presence of PI(3)P leads to the formation of omegasomes.

Macroautophagy

Autophagy (from Greek words for “self” and “eating”) is a process of digesting or degrading cytoplasmic molecules (proteins, lipids, sugars and organelles). Macroautophagy is the main autophagic pathway, used primarily to eradicate damaged cell organelles such as mitochondria, ribosomes, etc., which helps in supplying amino acids and energy to the cells, and maintains longevity. Omegasomes positioned on the endoplasmic reticulum, are enriched with PI(3)P and PI(3)P-binding proteins, and responsible for the formation of phagophores. The omegasome is present at the opening of the sack-like phagophore while items destined for degradation by macroautophagy are loaded into the phagophore. There are specific receptor proteins that recruit items to the phagophore. The phagophore expands to accommodate the items, until the omegasome is closed to produce the roughly spherical autophagosome. How autophagosomes are "detached" or "exit" from the omegasome is not clear, but autophagocytosis associated protein Atg3 and other proteins are required. Additionally, collections of thin tubules at the junction between omegasome and phagophore appear to be involved. Actin is also believed to be important. It has been observed that various pathogen infections that lead to the induction of autophagy display the formation of autophagosomes through omegasomes developed as an innate response to the infection.

Function 
Omegasomes display significant functional roles in different biochemical pathways which assist in various autophagosome processes. Omegasomes attract the effectors needed to target PI3P, while also ensuring that the autophagosomal membranes fuse with the double membrane vesicles and promote autophagosome formation. Omegasomes act as progenitors of autophagosome formation during the autophagy pathway. There are various autophagosome mediators involved in autophagy, however it is the omegasome regulation of the pathway that provides a smooth transition of autophagosome formation, and enrichment of nutrients in the cells.

References

Membrane biology